Federal Highway 131 (Carretera Federal 131) is a Federal Highway of Mexico. Federal Highway 131 is split into two segments: the first segment travels from Teziutlán, Puebla in the north to Perote, Veracruz in the south. The second segment, entirely within Oaxaca, travels from south of Oaxaca de Juárez in the north to Puerto Escondido in the south.

References

131